Rage is a 2009 Mexican-Spanish romance film directed by Sebastián Cordero.

Cast 
 Martina García as Rosa
 Gustavo Sánchez Parra as José María
 Concha Velasco as Sra. Torres
 Xabier Elorriaga as Sr. Torres
 Icíar Bollaín as Marimar
 Àlex Brendemühl as Álvaro 
 Yon González as Adrián

References

External links 

2009 romance films
2009 films
Spanish romance films
Mexican romance films
2000s Spanish-language films
2000s Mexican films